Lee Nak-hoon (March 27, 1936 – October 7, 1998) was a South Korean actor. Lee earned a fame for his characteristic and mature acting.

Biography
Lee Nak-hoon was born in Seoul, Korea in 1936. After graduation from Kyunggi High School in 1956, Lee studied Aesthetics at Seoul National University. When he finished his second year of the study, Lee went to the United States to history at Miami University.

Lee starred in over 800 drama series, and 80 plays. Lee translated and introduced the popular US TV series, The Six Million Dollar Man and Columbo to the South Korean public. Lee also served as a member of the National Assembly from 1981 to 1985.

Lee married Choe Yeong-bok (최영복) and had one son and daughter with her. Lee died of heart disease and diabetes in 1998.

Filmography
*Note; the whole list is referenced.

Awards
1978, the 14th Baeksang Arts Awards : Best TV Actor (천녀화)
1992, the 28th Baeksang Arts Awards : Best TV Actor (옛날의 금잔디, KBS)

References

External links

1936 births
1998 deaths
Miami University alumni
South Korean male film actors
South Korean male television actors
Seoul National University alumni
Members of the National Assembly (South Korea)
South Korean actor-politicians
20th-century South Korean male actors